N-Methyltryptamine (NMT) is a member of the substituted tryptamine chemical class and a natural product which is biosynthesized in the human body from tryptamine by certain N-methyltransferase enzymes, such as indolethylamine N-methyltransferase. It is a common component in human urine. NMT is an alkaloid derived from L-tryptophan that has been found in the bark, shoots and leaves of several plant genera, including Virola, Acacia, Mimosa, and Desmanthus—often together with the related compounds N,N-dimethyltryptamine (DMT) and 5-methoxy-N,N-dimethyltryptamine (5-MeO-DMT).

Orally administered NMT appears to produce no psychoactive effects, likely as a result of extensive first-pass metabolism. However, it may become active upon combination with a MAOA inhibitor (MAOI).
By vaporization NMT shows activity at 50–100 mg, with a duration of 45–70 minutes; duration of visual effects 15–30 seconds. Effects are primarily non-visual.

Legality 
In the United States N-Methyltryptamine is considered a schedule 1 controlled substance as an positional isomer of Alpha-methyltryptamine (AMT)

See also 
 N-Ethyltryptamine (NET)
 N,N,-Dimethyltryptamine (DMT)
 Acacia confusa (a natural source of NMT, with other tryptamines, 1.63%. Buchanan et al. 2007)
 Acacia obtusifolia (NMT up to 2/3 alkaloid content)
 Acacia simplicifolia (synon. A. simplex) (1.44% NMT in bark, 0.29% twigs, Pouet et al. 1976)
 Desmanthus illinoensis  (NMT major component seasonally)

References

External links 
 NMT Entry in TIHKAL
 NMT Entry in TiHKAL • info

Tryptamine alkaloids
Psychedelic tryptamines
Serotonin receptor agonists